This article chronicles the releases associated with the long running novel, manga and anime series Legend of the Galactic Heroes.

1970–1980s

1979
Yoshiki Tanaka started writing and planned the work , but was not possible to publish because of publisher's bankruptcy.

1982
The editor of Tokuma Shoten who unexpectedly read the incomplete manuscript of Chess game of the Galaxy recommended Tanaka to restructure and write the episode of the prologue chapter of the story.
Nov. volume 1 Dawn publication

1983
Sep. volume 2 Ambition publication

1984
Apr. volume 3 Lying publication
Oct. volume 4 Stratagem publication

1985
Apr. volume 5 Climax publication
Jun. side story The Silver Valley publication
Jul. side story Disgrace publication
Oct. volume 6 Flying  publication
Nov. side story Person who crushes star starting a serial

1986
May. volume 7 Angry waves publication
Jul. side story Morning's Dream, Evening's Song publication
Aug. side story Golden Wings publication as a manga, art by Katsumi Michihara

1987
Jan. side story Julian's Iserlohn diary starting a serial
Jan. volume 8 Separation publication
May. volume 9 Disturbance publication
Nov. volume 10 Sunset publication. conclusion

1988
Jan. side story A Hundred Billion Stars, A Hundred Billion Lights publication
Feb. Anime 
Game (Family Computer) Legend of the Galactic Heroes: My Conquest is the Sea of Stars by KEMCO

1989
Jan. Manga Legend of the Galactic Heroes starting a serial (1989–2000, 11 volumes), art by Katsumi Michihara
Apr. side story Spiral Labyrinth starting a serial
Anime Legend of the Galactic Heroes 1st season (1989–1990, 26 episodes)
Game(MSX etc.) Ginga Eiyū Densetsu by Bothtec

1990s

1990
Game (PC-9801 etc.) Ginga Eiyū Densetsu II by Bothtec

1991
Anime Legend of the Galactic Heroes 2nd season (1991–1992, 28 episodes)

1992
Dec. Anime

1993
Dec. Anime 
Game (PC-9801 etc.) Ginga Eiyū Densetsu III by Bothtec

1994
Anime Legend of the Galactic Heroes 3rd season (1994–1995, 32 episodes)
Game (PC-9801 etc.) Ginga Eiyū Densetsu IV by Bothtec

1996
Anime Legend of the Galactic Heroes 4th season (1996–1997, 24 episodes)
Game (Sega Saturn) Ginga Eiyū Densetsu

1997
Game (Sega Saturn) Ginga Eiyū Densetsu Plus

1998
Anime Legend of the Galactic Heroes Side stories 1st season (1998–1999, 24 episodes)
Game (PlayStation) Ginga Eiyū Densetsu
Game (Windows) Ginga Eiyū Densetsu V by Bothtec
A board game

1999
Anime Legend of the Galactic Heroes Side stories 2nd season (1999–2000, 28 episodes)
Game (PlayStation) Chibi-Chara-Game Ginga Eiyū Densetsu

2000s

2000
Game (Windows) Ginga Eiyū Densetsu VI by Bothtec

2003
The DVD box set of the anime version was released. 
Game (Windows) Ginga Eiyū Densetsu VS by Bothtec

2004
Game (Windows) Ginga Eiyū Densetsu VII by Bothtec

2007
Dec. Ginga Eiyū Densetsu Legend Box, containing all animated material on 46 discs, is released.

2008
Game (Windows) Ginga Eiyū Densetsu by Bandai Namco

2016
Mar. volume 1 Dawn publication (English) (Daniel Huddleston, Translator) (Haikasoru, Publisher) (Paperback, Kindle, Audible)

References

Legend of the Galactic Heroes